The following is a list of interoceanic canals, that is, canals or canal proposals, which form waterways for traffic to connect one ocean to another.

List

See also
 List of transcontinental canals
 Lists of canals

References

Interocean
 Ship canals
 International canals